Martina Navratilova and Pam Shriver defeated Claudia Kohde-Kilsch and Hana Mandlíková in the final, 5–7, 6–3, 6–2 to win the women's double tennis title at the 1984 French Open. It was the first step in an eventual Grand Slam for the pair.

Rosalyn Fairbank and Candy Reynolds were the defending champions, but lost in the second round to Kim Sands and Corinne Vanier.

Seeds

Draw

Finals

Top half

Section 1

Section 2

Bottom half

Section 3

Section 4

References
1984 French Open – Women's draws and results at the International Tennis Federation

Women's Doubles
French Open by year – Women's doubles
1984 in women's tennis
1984 in French women's sport